Larry Wayne Thomas Jr. (born October 25, 1969) is an American retired professional baseball pitcher.  During his three seasons in the major leagues (1995–1997), he played for the Chicago White Sox.

Amateur career
Born in Miami, Florida, Thomas played college baseball for the University of Maine Black Bears under head coach John Winkin. In 1990, he played collegiate summer baseball in the Cape Cod Baseball League for the Yarmouth-Dennis Red Sox, where he was named outstanding pitcher at the league's annual all-star game. In 1991, he was named conference pitcher of the year.

Professional career
Thomas was drafted by the White Sox in the 2nd round of the 1991 amateur draft, and played that year with the Class A (Short Season) Utica Blue Sox and Double-A Birmingham Barons. He made his major league debut with the White Sox in 1995. In 1996, he appeared in 57 games for Chicago, posting a 3.23 earned run average. He appeared in only five games for the White Sox in 1997, and after the season was traded with Al Levine to the Texas Rangers for Benji Gil, and was assigned to Texas' Triple-A Oklahoma RedHawks for 1998.

References

External links

1969 births
Living people
Chicago White Sox players
Major League Baseball pitchers
Baseball players from Miami
Utica Blue Sox players
Birmingham Barons players
Sarasota White Sox players
Nashville Sounds players
Oklahoma RedHawks players
Nashua Pride players
Yarmouth–Dennis Red Sox players
Maine Black Bears baseball players